Cosio may refer to:

Cosio di Arroscia, an Italian municipality in the Province of Imperia, Liguria
Cosio Valtellino, an Italian municipality in the Province of Sondrio, Lombardy
Cosío, a Mexican municipality in the state of Aguascalientes
Cosío, a Mexican town and municipal seat in the state of Aguascalientes